HMS L71 was a late-model L-class submarine built for the Royal Navy during the First World War. The boat was not completed before the end of the war and was sold for scrap in 1938.

Design and description
L52 and its successors were modified to maximise the number of 21-inch (53.3 cm) torpedoes carried in the bow. They displaced  on the surface and  submerged. The L-class submarines had a crew of 44 officers and ratings.

For surface running, the boats were powered by two 12-cylinder Vickers  diesel engines, each driving one propeller shaft. When submerged each propeller was driven by a  electric motor. They could reach  on the surface and  underwater.

The boats were armed with six 21-inch torpedo tubes in the bow. They carried eight reload torpedoes for a grand total of a dozen torpedoes. They were also armed with two  deck guns.

Construction and career
HMS L71 was laid down on 29 August 1917 by Scotts Shipbuilding and Engineering Company at their Greenock shipyard, launched on 17 May 1919, and completed on 23 January 1920.

On commissioning, L71 joined the 2nd Submarine Flotilla, based at Devonport. The boat was sold for scrap on 25 March 1938 at Milford Haven.

Notes

References
 
 
 
 

 

British L-class submarines
Ships built on the River Clyde
1919 ships
World War I submarines of the United Kingdom
Royal Navy ship names